Otto Ziege (14 June 1926 – 8 November 2014) was a former German racing cyclist. He won the German National Road Race in 1949.

References

External links

1926 births
2014 deaths
German male cyclists
Cyclists from Berlin
German cycling road race champions
20th-century German people